Viktor Berko (born 21 September 1992 in Voznesensk, Ukraine) is a Ukrainian football forward who last played for Livyi Bereh Kyiv.

Career
Berko is a product of FC Zelenyi Hai Voznesensk playing at the Ukrainian Youth Football League.

Until 2012 he stayed with his home team playing in regional competitions. After that Berko moved to the main football club of the region playing at professional level.

He debuted at professional level on 3 April 2012 in the game against FC Odesa which was tied at 0. His first goal he scored on 3 May 2012 in 2–4 loss against FC Helios Kharkiv.

References

External links
 
 
 

1992 births
Living people
People from Voznesensk
Ukrainian footballers
Association football forwards
MFC Mykolaiv players
FC Hirnyk Kryvyi Rih players
FC Livyi Bereh Kyiv players
Ukrainian First League players
Ukrainian Second League players
Sportspeople from Mykolaiv Oblast